Prince Sultan University (PSU), located in Riyadh, Saudi Arabia is the first private university founded in Saudi Arabia. It is owned by the Riyadh Philanthropic Society for Sciences, which named it in honor of its first patron, Prince Sultan.

Initially, it was founded as Prince Sultan Private College in 1999 and received university status in 2003. The university offers a number of bachelor's and master's degrees in various business, technical, and humanities fields.

College and Department 

 College of Business Administration
Department of Accounting
Department of Finance
Department of Marketing
Department of Aviation and management
MBA
 College of Engineering
Department of Engineering Management
Department of Interior Design Engineering
Department of Communication and Network Engineering
Department of Architectural Engineering 
 College of Law
 College of Humanities
Department of English language and Translation
Department of Linguistics
 College of Computer and Information Science
Department of Computer Science
Department of Information System

Notable alumni
 Ahmed Alsuwaiyan, was appointed Governor and board member of the Digital Government Authority (DGA) in May 2021.

External links
(This is not an official University forum) Prince Sultan University - forums
 http://www.psu.edu.sa/en/AboutPSU/Overview/Pages/InternationalRanking.aspx

1999 establishments in Saudi Arabia
Universities and colleges in Saudi Arabia
Educational institutions established in 1999
Education in Riyadh
Prince Sultan University